The Great Sheffield Flood was a flood that devastated parts of Sheffield, England, on 11 March 1864, when the Dale Dyke Dam broke as its reservoir was being filled for the first time. At least 240 people died and more than 600 houses were damaged or destroyed by the flood. The immediate cause was a crack in the embankment, the cause of which was never determined. The dam's failure led to reforms in engineering practice, setting standards on specifics that needed to be met when constructing such large-scale structures. The dam was rebuilt in 1875.

Dale Dyke Dam

Sheffield is a city and subdivision of South Yorkshire, England. As the town industrialised, its population grew from 45,478 in 1801 to 185,157 in 1861. This rapid population growth resulted in greatly increased demand for water, which led to the construction of the Dale Dyke Dam for the purpose of providing a more efficient source of clean water. It was created by the Sheffield Waterworks Company (SWWC). During the late 1850s, the company purchased land in the Loxley Valley to the north-west of the town, on which to build a reservoir. By the 1860s the dam and its associated works had been passed as satisfactory and it was allowed to fill with water.

Collapse of Dale Dyke Dam 

On the night of 11 March 1864, assisted by a strong south-western gale, the newly built dam, known as the Dale Dyke Dam in Bradfield Dale near Low Bradfield on the River Loxley, collapsed while it was being filled for the first time. An estimated 3 million cubic metres (700 million imperial gallons) of water swept down the Loxley Valley, through Loxley Village and on to Malin Bridge and Hillsborough, where the River Loxley joins the River Don. The flood continued south down the Don into Sheffield centre, around the eastward bend of the Don at Lady's Bridge, then to Attercliffe, past the sites of what later became Don Valley Stadium, Sheffield Arena and Meadowhall Centre, and on to Rotherham. A wall of water moved swiftly down the valley, destroying everything in its course. The centre of the town, situated on the hill to the south, escaped damage, but the densely populated district of the Wicker, around the new railway viaduct (constructed by the Manchester, Sheffield and Lincolnshire Railway), was completely destroyed. The waterworks company's consultant engineer, John Towlerton Leather, was one of a family of worthy Yorkshire engineers who were involved in such work. His uncle, George Leather, had been responsible for reservoirs around Leeds and Bradford, and one of these was the scene of a dramatic collapse, in 1852, when 81 people died. John Leather and resident engineer John Gunson were working closely together during the construction of the dam. Leather designed the dam and oversaw its construction whereas Gunson directed and supervised the construction of the dam. Gunson was on site the night of the collapse and stated that there was a concerning crack in the outer slope of the embankment. Gunson convinced himself that the crack was not harmful but still took the precaution of opening up the valves on the middle of the embankment to allow more water through. This failed to prevent the crack from worsening.

Aftermath
The mayor, Thomas Jessop, quickly set up a relief fund and help was provided for the homeless and needy. Sheffield was quickly supplied with aid wherever needed. The mayor ordered a meeting "For the purpose of considering and adopting such measures as may be deemed necessary to meet sufferings occasioned by this dreadful calamity", raising over £4,000. On 18 March 1864 the mayor called another meeting, but this time it was for anyone who could afford it to give up one day's wage to give to those in need. A relief committee was created, and in total over £42,000 was raised.

The company denied any problems relating to their structure and design of the dam, and believed that the cause of the crack and the collapse involved a landslide or landslip. Public perception, informed by the Coroner's court and the press, saw the collapse as due to a failure in the mode of construction of the dam. The professional inquiry was conducted, and progressed to parliamentary investigations and institutional deliberations. The experts could not agree about the causes of the Dale Dyke collapse. They noted that even with the cracks the collapse of the whole dam was unforeseeable. The corporation had found two men who either were or were becoming president and then found five other engineers, all of whom had already been or about to become presidents of the Civils. They thought that on the basis of landslipping they would pardon the Sheffield Waterworks Company from any carelessness and that the collapse of the Dale Dyke Dam was an unpredictable accident. They continued:

We are moreover of the opinion that all the arrangements made by your engineers were such as might have been reasonably expected to have proved sufficient for the purposes for which they were intended and that, if the ground beneath the bank had not moved, this work would have been as safe and as perfect as the other five or six large reservoirs of the company which have so long supplied the town of Sheffield and the rivers Rivelin, Loxley and Don with water.
As for the physical damage in Sheffield and all the nearby areas hit in this short space of time, 238 people died and some 700 animals were drowned; 130 buildings were destroyed and 500 partially damaged; 15 bridges were swept away and six others badly damaged. The engineering profession at this time possessed a weekly magazine, The Engineer, that provided both an excellent contribution to the technical press and a platform of public relations. An editorial headed "The Bradfield Reservoir" on 18 March 1864 reflected the anxiety of the moment:
Its fall, coupled with that of the failure of the Holmfirth reservoir ... show that the practice of civil engineering is far from what it should be ... That the forthcoming investigation will be of the most searching character there can be no doubt.
A fortnight later, under the same title, it went on:
The broken dam was constructed much according to the ordinary practice in such works. It failed nonetheless ...That the Bradfield dam was lamentably defective no one can doubt ... The Bradfield catastrophe, in its way, is a useful warning to the whole profession.

The claims for damages formed one of the largest insurance claims of the Victorian period.

Rebuilding

The collapse of the Dale Dyke Dam led to reforms in engineering practice. The court criticised the design and the construction of the dam. They focused on things such as the placing of the outlet pipes; the puddle wall thickness; the method by which the embankment had been built up from railway tip-wagons; the inadequacy of the overflow arrangements, and the practice of removing spoil for the embankment from the area to be flooded. This then set standards on specifics that needed to be met when constructing such large-scale structures as the Dale Dyke Dam. The Dale Dyke dam was eventually rebuilt in 1875, but on a smaller scale. As for John Gunson, most of the blame fell on him, although the company recognised his loyalty by retaining him in its service until he died in 1886. The Government started a Board of Inundation Commissioners to pass judgement for compensation claims against the Waterworks Company. They also arbitrated 7,500 claims for loss of life and property which totalled £455,000. All but 650 claims were settled without recourse to the arbitration process, but those 650 claims took almost six months to process. The claims registers record the claimant, their marital status and address, as well as details of the claim and the outcome, and amount awarded in compensation. They provide a unique insight into mid-Victorian Sheffield's trade and industry with claims listed for stock, tools and premises damaged and lost. The claims for furniture, clothes, books, toys and household utensils and goods help build up a picture of workers' lives at the time. A flood memorial stone marks the site of the original dam wall and footpaths to explore the area.

150th anniversary
March 2014 saw the 150th anniversary of the disaster. Events took place to commemorate the occasion, including an illustrated talk and exhibition at Low Bradfield Village Hall, guided walks to the dam, memorial services at both St Nicholas, High Bradfield and St Polycarps, Malin Bridge, and a public talk at the University of Sheffield by the Institution of Civil Engineers and the British Dam Society. A commemorative tankard and plate were produced by the Bradfield Historical Society and the Bradfield Brewery produced a special "flood beer" known as Dam It. The duo Toffee Music recorded a CD of Great Sheffield Flood songs.

See also
Floods in Sheffield 2007
Great Sheffield Gale, a lesser known disaster which devastated the city 98 years later
List of disasters in Great Britain and Ireland by death toll
List of deadliest floods

References

External links 
The Great Flood at Sheffield – 1864 
Newspaper article from 1864
Sheffield Flood – insurance claims archive
Sources for the Study of the Sheffield Flood 1864 Produced by Sheffield City Council's Libraries and Archives
Documentary film telling the story of the Great Sheffield Flood 1864

Sheffield Flood 1864, song by Toffee Music created for the 150th anniversary, on SoundCloud

1864 in England
Dam failures in Europe
Disasters in Yorkshire
Floods in England
History of Sheffield
1864 natural disasters
1864 floods in the United Kingdom
19th century in Yorkshire
March 1864 events
19th century in Sheffield
1864 disasters in the United Kingdom